The Atlanta Kookaburras is a United States Australian Football League team, based in Atlanta, United States. It was founded in 1998. They play in the USAFL.

See also

References

External links
 

Australian rules football clubs in the United States
Sports teams in Atlanta
Australian rules football clubs established in 1998
1998 establishments in Georgia (U.S. state)